The Greater Cincinnati area consists of many public school districts, most of which contain one or more high school. There are also a number of Catholic high schools, many of which are single-sex, along with many other private schools (which are generally co-ed).

Cincinnati Public Schools

The Cincinnati Public Schools district serves the city of Cincinnati (along with select areas outside of city limits).  Cincinnati Public Schools includes 16 high schools, each accepting students on a citywide basis.

Aiken High School
Clark Montessori High School
Dater High School
Gamble Montessori High School
Hughes Center High School
Oyler School
School for Creative and Performing Arts (SCPA)
Shroder Paideia High School
Taft High School
Virtual High School
Walnut Hills High School
Western Hills High School
Withrow High School
Woodward High School

Public High Schools (Listed by School District) of Greater Cincinnati

Indiana
Franklin County School Corporation (Franklin County High School)
Lawrenceburg School Corporation (Lawrenceburg High School)
South Dearborn School Corporation (South Dearborn High School)
Sunman Dearborn School Corporation (East Central High School)
Batesville Community School Corporation (Batesville High School)

Ohio
Batavia Local Schools (Batavia High School)
Bethel-Tate Local Schools Bethel-Tate High School
Clermont-Northeastern Local Schools (Clermont Northeastern High School)
Community Charter Schools in Cincinnati
Deer Park City Schools (Deer Park High School)
Fairfield City School District (Fairfield High School)
Felicity-Franklin Local Schools (Felicity-Franklin High School)
Finneytown Local School District (Finneytown High School)
Forest Hills School District
 Anderson High School
 Turpin High School
Franklin City Schools (Franklin High School)
Goshen Local Schools (Goshen High School)
Hamilton City School District (Hamilton High School)
Indian Hill Exempted Village School District (Indian Hill High School)
Kings Local School District (Kings High School)
Lakota Local School District
 Lakota East High School
 Lakota West High School
Lebanon City School District (Lebanon High School)
Little Miami Local School District (Little Miami High School)
Lockland City Schools (Lockland High School)
Loveland City Schools (Loveland High School)
Madeira City Schools (Madeira High School)
Mariemont City School District (Mariemont High School)
Mason City School District (Mason High School)
Middletown City School District (Middletown High School)
Milford Exempted Village Schools (Milford High School)
Monroe Local School District (Monroe High School)
Mount Healthy City School District (Mount Healthy High School)
New Richmond Exempted Village School District (New Richmond High School)
North College Hill City Schools (North College Hill High School)
Northwest Local School District
 Colerain High School
 Northwest High School
Norwood City Schools (Norwood High School)
Oak Hills Local School District (Oak Hills High School)
Princeton City School District (Princeton High School)
Reading Community Schools (Reading High School)
Ross Local School District (Ross High School)
Southwest Local School District (Harrison High School)
Springboro Community City Schools (Springboro High School)
St. Bernard/Elmwood Place City Schools (St. Bernard-Elmwood Place High School)
Sycamore Community School District (Sycamore High School)
Three Rivers Local School District (Taylor High School)
Wayne Local Schools (Waynesville High School)
West Clermont Local School District (West Clermont High School)
Western Brown Local Schools (Western Brown High School)
Williamsburg Local School District (Williamsburg High School)
Winton Woods City School District (Winton Woods High School)
Wyoming City School District (Wyoming High School)

Private schools

Ohio
Cincinnati is also home to a number of private schools, many of which are affiliated with the Roman Catholic Archdiocese of Cincinnati.

Archbishop Elder High School (boys)
Badin High School (coed)
Bishop Fenwick High School (coed)
DePaul Cristo Rey High School (coed) 
La Salle High School (boys)
Mercy McAuley High School (girls)
Archbishop McNicholas High School (coed)
Archbishop Moeller High School (boys)
Mount Notre Dame High School (girls)
Archbishop Purcell Marian High School (coed)
Roger Bacon High School (coed)
Seton High School (girls)
Cincinnati Country Day School (coed)
Cincinnati Hills Christian Academy (coed)
Lakota Christian School (coed)
Liberty Bible Academy
Mars Hill Academy (coed)
Miami Valley Christian Academy
Purcell Marian High School (coed)
Royalmont Academy (beginning 2014)
St. Edmund Campion Academy(coed)  Oakley, Cincinnati, Ohio 
St. Rita School for the Deaf
St. Xavier High School (boys)
St. Ursula Academy (girls)
Seven Hills School (coed)
Summit Country Day School (coed)
Ursuline Academy (girls)

Kentucky

 Bishop Brossart High School (coed)
 Covington Catholic High School (boys)
 Covington Latin School (coed)
 Calvary Christian High School (coed)
 Heritage Academy (coed)
 Holy Cross High School (coed)
 Newport Central Catholic High School (coed)
 Notre Dame Academy (girls)
 St. Henry District High School (coed)
 Villa Madonna Academy (coed)

See also
List of high schools in Indiana
List of high schools in Kentucky
List of high schools in Ohio

 
High schools
Cincinnati